Gray Spur is a rock spur between Aaron Glacier and Counts Icefall on the east side of the Ford Massif, in the Thiel Mountains of Antarctica. A small peak rises from the end of the spur. It was mapped by the United States Geological Survey Thiel Mountains party of 1960–61, and was named by the Advisory Committee on Antarctic Names for James L. Gray, a U.S. Navy aviation machinist's mate, who lost his life in a crash of a P2V Neptune aircraft soon after take-off from Wilkes Station, November 9, 1961.

References

Ridges of Ellsworth Land